Hinterthal ( above sea level) is found approximately  to the east of Saalfelden and some 60 minutes southwest of the city of Salzburg, Austria. It is at the foot of the High King Mountain (Hochkönig) as part of Maria Alm, in the Austrian state of Salzburg.

Hinterthal is situated at the end of the valley and as a result, is a quiet and peaceful place to visit.

Mainly known as a winter ski resort and a summer hiking area, Hinterthal has close views of the High King Mountain Hochkönig and Sleeping Virgin Mountains.

This was one of the first places non-Austrian people could buy homes in Austria, and consequently, it is home to many rich and famous people.

There are several hotels in Hinterthal: Hotel Urslauerhof, Hotel Steinbock, Hotel Almhof, Hotel Jagdgut Wachtelhof and Hotel Haus salzburg.

Recently there has been a luxury development of several chalets and luxury apartments situated around Florysee, the lake in Hinterthal. Many of these are available for rent.

Hinterthal also has an impressive snow record due to its micro climate and the ski season usually starts in late November and lasts until mid April.

Hinterthal is also part of the High King Mountain Ski Area.

Gallery

References

External links
Weather in Hinterthal

Cities and towns in Zell am See District